The 2019 Ole Miss Rebels football team represented The University of Mississippi in the 2019 NCAA Division I FBS football season. The Rebels played their home games at Vaught–Hemingway Stadium in Oxford, Mississippi and competed in the Western Division of the Southeastern Conference (SEC). They were led by third-year head coach Matt Luke.

Previous season
The Rebels finished the 2018 season 5–7, 1–7 in SEC play to finish in sixth place in the Western Division. The 2018 season was the last season in which the Rebels had to serve a postseason ban.

Preseason

Coaching changes
Head coach Matt Luke bolstered his coaching staff with the hiring of two former Power 5 head coaches to coordinator positions prior to the 2019 season. The school announced the hiring of Mike MacIntyre to be the new defensive coordinator on December 10, 2018, and announced the hiring of Rich Rodriguez as the new offensive coordinator on December 31. MacIntyre had spent the previous six seasons as the head coach at Colorado and replaced 2018 co-defensive coordinators Wesley McGriff and Jason Jones, who both parted ways with Ole Miss. Rodriguez was most recently the head coach of Arizona, leaving after the 2017 season, and has also coached at West Virginia and Michigan. He replaced former offensive coordinator Phil Longo, who left to assume the same role at North Carolina.

Award watch lists
Listed in the order that they were released

SEC media poll
The SEC media poll was released on July 19, 2019 with the Rebels predicted to finish in sixth place in the West Division.

Recruiting

The Rebels' 2019 recruiting class finished at 22nd in the nation and 9th in the SEC, according to 247Sports.com.

Schedule
Ole Miss announced its 2019 football schedule on September 18, 2018. The 2019 schedule consists of 7 home and 5 away games in the regular season. The Rebels will host SEC opponents Arkansas, Vanderbilt, Texas A&M, and LSU, and will travel to Alabama, Missouri, Auburn, and Mississippi State.

The Rebels open the 2019 season on the road against rivals, Memphis from The American. The Rebels then host Southeastern Louisiana from the FCS on September 14. The first ever Pac-12 team visits Oxford on September 21 when California plays the Rebels. The Rebels will play their final non-conference game on November 9 against FBS Independent, New Mexico State.

Schedule Source:

Game summaries

at Memphis

Arkansas

No. 23 (FCS) Southeastern Louisiana

No. 23 California

at No. 2 Alabama

Vanderbilt

at Missouri

Texas A&M

at Auburn

New Mexico State

No. 1 LSU

at Mississippi State

Roster and coaching staff

References

Ole Miss
Ole Miss Rebels football seasons
Ole Miss Rebels football